= Sadagaat Organization =

Sudan non-profit community

- Formation: 2001; 25 years ago
- Founded at: Diaspora
- Type: Non Governmental Organization
- Purpose: Charity Organization for Sudanese
- Headquarters: Khartoum, Sudan
- Region served: Sudan
- Founder: Anwar Yagoub

Sadagaat Organization is a Sudan based Non-governmental Organisation (NGO) that uses charity and social work to help Sudanese people in need through projects and volunteer-run initiative. It was founded in 2001 by a small group of Sudanese living in diaspora.

== History ==
Sadagaat started as an informal charity in 2001. The founder, Anwar Yagoub, and co-founder, Anwar Ibrahim, said the initiatve was birthed from the culture of the Sudanese people to give back to their community. This charity started with a collective program like the Ramadan package and random small-scale support to the needy Sudanese people. In 2004, the Ramadan package became their trademark undertaking. Sadagaat became a registered NGO in Sudan in 2012.

== Notable Achievements ==
- The reduction of the 48% mortality to less than 10% rate at a government-run center at Maygouma area of Khartoum.
- In 2016, 350 Ramadan meal packages moved to 10,000 meal packages.
- In the 2022 conflicts and natural disasters that led to over 418,00 displaced people in Sudan, Sagadaat played an active role in reaching the displaced people.

== See also ==
- El Hawadith Street Initiative – Humanitarian organization in Sudan
