= El Hawadith Street Initiative =

Humanitarian organization in Sudan

El Hawadith Street Initiative (HSI), also called Sharia’ al-Hawadith (Arabic: مبادرة شارع الحوادث), is a Sudanese volunteer humanatrian founded in Khartoum it was established in 2012 by youths in their twenties to support needy patients who can not afford medical treatment, in Khartoum and then to other cities in Sudan. The initiatives started with recreational programs for cancer patients to public for the donations of blood, the initiatives was later changed to connecting donors directly to the patients through social media.

== Activities ==
During the Sudanese conflict, volunteers from the El Hawadith Street Initiative provided humanitarian assistance by helping affected communities access medical supplies and basic health services in areas where healthcare systems had been affected.

In March 2025, volunteers from the Hawadith Street Initiative assisted in preparing iftar meals for displaced people in Port Sudan during the Islamic holy month of Ramadan.

== See also ==
- Sadagaat Organization – Sudan non-profit community
